Salitral Creek, is a tributary stream of the Rio Puerco, in Rio Arriba County, New Mexico. Salitral means in Spanish, "place where saltpeter [salitre] is found."

References

Rivers of Rio Arriba County, New Mexico
Rivers of New Mexico
Old Spanish Trail (trade route)